John Dierkes (February 10, 1905 – January 8, 1975) was an American actor who appeared in a number of classic Hollywood films. Before becoming an actor, he had been an economist.

Life and career
Dierkes was born on February 10, 1905, in Cincinnati, Ohio. He attended Brown University and subsequently went to work as an economist for the United States Department of State. In 1941 he joined the Red Cross and served in Britain during World War II. There he met director John Huston who recommended that he try Hollywood after the war. Instead, Dierkes went to work for the U.S. Treasury Department which coincidentally sent him to Hollywood to function as technical advisor for the film To the Ends of the Earth (1948) and Orson Welles cast him as Ross in his version of Macbeth in the same year. Welles used Dierkes again in his Touch of Evil (1958). He married Cynthia Dierkes and they had two daughters and two sons.

Because of his appearance and very tall frame (6 ft 6 in), Dierkes enjoyed a long career as a character actor, often portraying either villains or soldiers. One noteworthy performance cast Dierkes as the compassionate and caring scientist Dr. Chapman in the 1951 film The Thing from Another World which remains a mainstay science fiction classic of the 1950s. His performance provided sanity and calm amid the tension and chills of the action thriller. Although playing against type, his low tone and measured monotone dialogue was a good counter to the rapid and chaotic overlapping dialogue throughout the movie, giving brief pauses between each actor's lines as the tension in each scene increased.  In 1951 he played a soldier next to Audie Murphy in the classic film, Red Badge of Courage. In the 1953 film Shane, Dierkes portrays the callous Morgan Ryker with great effect, director George Stevens making good use of Dierkes' craggy features. Alongside his 'brother' Rufus (Emile Meyer) and Jack Wilson (Jack Palance) he completes a trio of villains who are dispatched by the title character, Shane, in the final bar room shootout. One of his more memorable scenes is in the 1960 film, The Alamo. Dierkes portrays a Tennessean named Jocko, who is torn between leaving before the attack to care for his blind wife, or staying to support the Texans' cause. Understanding that if Jocko stays to fight she will likely be widowed, Jocko's wife coaxes him to stay and defend the fort, despite her disability.

His other film credits included The Naked Jungle (1954), The Raid (1954), Jubal (1956), The Daughter of Dr. Jekyll (1957), Blood Arrow (1958), The Left Handed Gun (1958), The Buccaneer (1958), The Hanging Tree (1959), The Oregon Trail (1959), One-Eyed Jacks (1961), The Premature Burial (1962), X: The Man with the X-ray Eyes (1963), The Haunted Palace (1963), The Omega Man (1971) and Rage (1972).

He appeared on the television screen on Gunsmoke,  as “Mr. Rydell” in the 1956 episode “The Roundup” (S2E4) and as “Ace” in the 1957 episode “Gone Straight” (S2E20) and as "Indian" in the 1971 episode "My Brother's Keeper" (S17E10).

Dierkes died on January 8, 1975, from emphysema in Los Angeles, California. Cremated, Ashes scattered, per Find a Grave.

Partial filmography

Macbeth (1948) – Ross
Three Husbands (1950) – Night Court Judge (uncredited)
The Thing from Another World (1951) – Dr. Chapman (uncredited)
The Red Badge of Courage (1951) – Jim Conklin – the Tall Soldier
Silver City (1951) – Arnie
The Sellout (1952) – Big Jake (uncredited)
Les Misérables (1952) – Bosun (uncredited)
Plymouth Adventure (1952) – Greene (uncredited)
A Perilous Journey (1953) – First Mate
Shane (1953) – Morgan Ryker
The Vanquished (1953) – General Morris
Abbott and Costello Meet Dr. Jekyll and Mr. Hyde (1953) – Batley
The Moonlighter (1953) – Sheriff Daws
Gun Fury (1953) – Sheepherder (uncredited)
The Naked Jungle (1954) – Gruber
Prince Valiant (1954) – Sir Tristram (uncredited)
The Desperado (1954) – Police Sergeant
Silver Lode (1954) – Blacksmith (uncredited)
The Raid (1954) – Cpl. Fred Deane
Passion (1954) – Escobar (uncredited)
Hell's Outpost (1954) – Swede – the Cook (uncredited)
Timberjack (1955) – Sheriff (uncredited)
The Road to Denver (1955) – Sheriff Dedrick (uncredited)
Not as a Stranger (1955) – Bursar
Betrayed Women (1955) – Cletus Ballard
The Vanishing American (1955) – Freil
Jubal (1956) – Carson – Horgan Rider
The Fastest Gun Alive (1956) – Walter Hutchins (uncredited)
Friendly Persuasion (1956) – Farmer (uncredited)
The Halliday Brand (1957) – Reverend
Duel at Apache Wells (1957) – Bill Sowers
The Guns of Fort Petticoat (1957) – Texas Storekeeper (uncredited)
The Buckskin Lady (1957) – Swanson
The Daughter of Dr. Jekyll (1957) – Jacob
Valerie (1957) – Bartender (uncredited)
Death in Small Doses (1957) – 'Shug' Grandon (uncredited)
The Rawhide Trail (1958) – Hangman
Touch of Evil (1958) – Policeman (uncredited)
Blood Arrow (1958) – Ez
The Left Handed Gun (1958) – McSween
The Buccaneer (1958) – Deacon
The Hanging Tree (1959) – Society Red
The Oregon Trail (1959) – Gabe Hastings
The Alamo (1960) – Jocko Robertson
One-Eyed Jacks (1961) – Chet
The Comancheros (1961) – Ranger Bill Larsen (uncredited)
The Premature Burial (1962) – Sweeney
Convicts 4 (1962) – Cell Block Guard (uncredited)
X: The Man with the X-ray Eyes (1963) – Preacher (uncredited)
The Haunted Palace (1963) – Benjamin West / Jacob West 
Johnny Cool (1963) – Cripple
The Cardinal (1963) – Redneck (uncredited)
The Omega Man (1971) – Family Member #2
Buck and the Preacher (1972) – Townsman in Opening Credits (uncredited)
Rage (1972) – Bill Parker
Oklahoma Crude (1973) – Farmer

References

External links

1905 births
1975 deaths
Brown University alumni
American Red Cross personnel
Male actors from Cincinnati
American male film actors
American male television actors
Deaths from emphysema
20th-century American male actors
20th-century American economists
Actors from Ohio
Economists from Ohio